The legality of cannabis for medical and recreational use varies by country, in terms of its possession, distribution, and cultivation, and (in regards to medical) how it can be consumed and what medical conditions it can be used for. These policies in most countries are regulated by three United Nations treaties: the 1961 Single Convention on Narcotic Drugs, the 1971 Convention on Psychotropic Substances, and the 1988 Convention Against Illicit Traffic in Narcotic Drugs and Psychotropic Substances. Since its descheduling in 2020, cannabis is classified as a Schedule I drug under the Single Convention treaty, meaning that signatories can allow medical use but that it is considered to be an addictive drug with a serious risk of abuse.

The use of cannabis for recreational purposes is prohibited in most countries; however, many have adopted a policy of decriminalization to make simple possession a non-criminal offense (often similar to a minor traffic violation). Others have much more severe penalties such as some Asian and Middle Eastern countries where possession of even small amounts is punished by imprisonment for several years. Countries that have legalized recreational use of cannabis are Canada, Georgia, Malta, Mexico, South Africa, Thailand, and Uruguay, plus 21 states, 3 territories, and the District of Columbia in the United States and the Australian Capital Territory in Australia. Commercial sale of recreational cannabis is legalized nationwide in three countries (Canada, Thailand, and Uruguay) and in all subnational U.S. jurisdictions that have legalized possession except Washington, D.C. A policy of limited enforcement has also been adopted in many countries, in particular the Netherlands where the sale of cannabis is tolerated at licensed coffeeshops.

Countries that have legalized medical use of cannabis include Argentina, Australia, Barbados, Brazil, Canada, Chile, Colombia, Costa Rica, Croatia, Cyprus, Czech Republic, Denmark, Ecuador, Finland, Georgia, Germany, Greece, Ireland, Israel, Italy, Jamaica, Lebanon, Luxembourg, Malawi, Malta, Mexico, the Netherlands, New Zealand, North Macedonia, Norway, Panama, Peru, Poland, Portugal, Rwanda, Saint Vincent and the Grenadines, San Marino, South Africa, Spain, Sri Lanka, Switzerland, Thailand, the United Kingdom, Uruguay, Vanuatu, Zambia, and Zimbabwe. Others have more restrictive laws that allow only the use of certain cannabis-derived pharmaceuticals, such as Sativex, Marinol, or Epidiolex. In the United States, 37 states, 4 territories, and the District of Columbia have legalized the medical use of cannabis, but at the federal level its use remains prohibited.

Legalization timeline

By country

See also

References

Cannabis law
Drug control law